The Journal of Empirical Research on Human Research Ethics is a peer-reviewed academic journal that covers ethics and medical ethics. The editor-in-chief is Joan E. Sieber (California State University, East Bay). It was established in 2006 and is published by SAGE Publications.

Abstracting and indexing 
The journal is abstracted and indexed in:
MEDLINE/PubMed
PsycINFO
Social Sciences Citation Index
Science Citation Index

According to the Journal Citation Reports, its 2017 impact factor is 0.953, ranking it 12th out of 16 journals in the category "Medical Ethics".

See also 
 List of ethics journals

References

External links 
 

SAGE Publishing academic journals
English-language journals
Ethics journals
Publications established in 2006
5 times per year journals